This is a list of seasons completed by the Memphis Tigers men's college basketball team.

Seasons

 The 1982–1986 NCAA tournament records were vacated by the NCAA.
 The 2007–08 season was vacated by the NCAA.

Notes

Memphis Tigers
 
Memphis Tigers basketball seasons